Tripi is a town and comune in the Metropolitan City of Messina, Sicily, southern Italy. It is located on the site of Abacaenum, an ancient Sicel town.

Public transport

Railways 
Novara-Montalbano-Furnari railway station is on the Palermo–Messina railway. It is served by trains run by Trenitalia, including services from Messina.
Outside of the station is available a Uber service by App.

Bus and tram 
Tripi is served by bus provided from Azienda Siciliana Trasporti.

People
 Francesco Todaro (1839–1918)

External links
Official website

Municipalities of the Metropolitan City of Messina